Xiuwu County is a county in the northwest of Henan province, China, bordering Shanxi province to the north. It is under the administration of the prefecture-level city of Jiaozuo and contains its northernmost point.

Administrative divisions
As 2012, this county is divided to 2 towns and 6 townships.
Towns
Chengguan
Xunfeng

Townships

Climate

References

County-level divisions of Henan
Jiaozuo